The Lithuania women's national softball team is the national team of the Lithuania. It is governed by the Lietuvos beisbolo asociacija. Team coached by Romanas Paskočimas.

Results
 World Championship

 nc = not competed

 European Championship

 nc = not competed

 ESF Junior Girls Championship

 nc = not competed

Team

References

External links
 Official website LBA
 International Softball Federation

Softball
Women's national softball teams
Softball in Lithuania